A human chain is a form of demonstration in which people link arms or hands as a show of political solidarity.

The chains can involve thousands of people, with the world record being claimed in 2020 by Bihar, India, which was estimated to include 51.7 million people across , to support the government's efforts towards environment conservation and eradication of social evils.

List of notable human chains

References